Porcupine Plain is a town in Saskatchewan, Canada. It is accessed by Highway 23. The town is located within the Porcupine Provincial Forest. The town was originally settled by returning World War I veterans  who settled in the area during the early 1920s. Quilly Willy is the town mascot used on promotional material. Porcupine Plain is the hometown of Calgary Hitmen play-by-play man Brad Curle, St. Louis Blues alumnus Kelly Chase, Paralympic athlete Colette Bourgonje, and TSN SportsCentre sportscaster Darren Dutchyshen, and the company Sweet Pure Honey.

Demographics 

See also 

 List of communities in Saskatchewan
 List of towns in Saskatchewan

References

External links

Porcupine No. 395, Saskatchewan
Towns in Saskatchewan